The Kane County Cougars are a professional baseball team located in Geneva, Illinois and are members of the American Association of Professional Baseball, an official Partner League of Major League Baseball (MLB). They play their home games at Northwestern Medicine Field. From 1991 to 2020, they were members of Minor League Baseball's Midwest League.

History
The Midwest League came to Kane County in 1991 when the Wausau Timbers relocated to Geneva, IL. The Wausau (1975–1990) Midwest League franchise was previously based in Decatur, Illinois (1952–74). The team has been known as the Cougars since moving to Kane County. They were affiliated with the Baltimore Orioles in 1991 and 1992, with the Florida Marlins from 1993 to 2002, the Oakland Athletics from 2003 until 2010, the Kansas City Royals for the 2011 and 2012 seasons, and the Chicago Cubs for the 2013 and 2014 seasons before affiliating with the Arizona Diamondbacks in 2015.

As a Marlins farm team, some key contributors to the 2003 World Series championship team played in Kane County on their way to the big leagues. Miguel Cabrera has had a notable career and 2003 Series MVP Josh Beckett played for the Cougars in 2000, while Dontrelle Willis had the league's best winning percentage and earned run average in 2002.

The Cougars play their home games at Northwestern Medicine Field, built in 1991. The franchise attendance record of 523,222 was set in 2001. The Cougars are perennially among the league leaders in attendance. On July 20, 2013 the Cougars became the first Class A team to attract 10 million fans. Nancy Faust, after 40 years with the Chicago White Sox, was the stadium organist for selected Cougar home games until her retirement after the 2015 season.

In 2020, due to the COVID-19 pandemic, the Cougars' season was cancelled along with the rest of Minor League Baseball. Later that year, the team was cut from the Midwest League and affiliated baseball as part of Major League Baseball's reorganization of the minor leagues. The team considered becoming a member of the MLB Draft League before joining the American Association, an independent MLB Partner League.

Playoffs

Mascots
The team's mascots are Ozzie T. Cougar and his sister Annie T. Cougar.

Roster

Notable alumni
Notable franchise alumni include:

 Mitch Nay (2022)
 Nick Franklin (2022–present)
 Mike Morin (2022)
 Steve Lombardozzi Jr. (2022)
 Cornelius Randolph (2022–present)
 Sherman Johnson (2022–present)
 Jack Anderson (2022)
 Bryce Brentz (2022)
 Nick Lovullo (2021)
 Josh Tols (2021)
 Vance Worley (2021–2022)
 Kacy Clemens (2021)
 Jake Cosart (2021)
 Anfernee Seymour (2021)
 Buddy Kennedy (2019)
 José Cuas (2019)
 Alek Thomas (2019)
 Geraldo Perdomo (2019)
 Jhoan Durán (2018)
 Matt Peacock (2018)
 José Herrera (2017–2019)
 Jazz Chisholm (2017–2018)
 Riley Smith (2017)
 Colin Poche (2017)
 Kevin Ginkel (2017)
 Jon Duplantier (2017)
 Joel Payamps (2016)
 Alex Young (2016)
 Sergio Alcántara (2015–2016)
 Ryan Burr (2015–2016)
 Ildemaro Vargas (2015)
 Zac Curtis (2015)
 Duane Underwood Jr. (2014)
 Jen-Ho Tseng (2014)
 Jacob Hannemann (2014)
 Paul Blackburn (2014)
 Víctor Caratini (2014)
 Mark Zagunis (2014)
 Zack Godley (2014)
 Kyle Schwarber (2014) MLB All-Star, 2016 World Series Champion
 David Bote (2013–2014)
 Pierce Johnson (2013–2014)
 Jeimer Candelario (2013–2014)
 Tayler Scott (2013)
 Dillon Maples (2013)
 Daniel Vogelbach (2013) MLB All-Star
 Rob Zastryzny (2013)
 Félix Peña (2013)
 Willson Contreras (2013) 2x MLB All-Star, 2016 World Series Champion
 Albert Almora (2013) 2016 World Series Champion
 Marco Hernández (2013)
 Andrew McKirahan (2013)
 Scott Baker (2013)
 Kyle Zimmer (2012)
 Brooks Pounders (2012)
 Lane Adams (2011–2012)
 Jason Adam (2011)
 Juan Graterol (2011)
 Yordano Ventura (2011) 2015 World Series Champion
 Murphy Smith (2009–2010)
 Tyson Ross (2008) MLB All-Star
 Trevor Cahill (2007) MLB All-Star, 2016 World Series Champion
 Sean Doolittle (2007) 2x MLB All-Star, 2019 World Series Champion
 Andrew Bailey (2007) 2x MLB All-Star, 2009 AL Rookie of the Year
 Jeff Gray (2006)
 Cliff Pennington (2005)
 Ryan Webb (2005)
 Dallas Braden (2004) Perfect game in 2010
 Huston Street (2004) 2x MLB All-Star; 2005 AL Rookie of the Year
 John Baker (2003)
 Joe Blanton (2003) 2008 World Series Champion
 Nelson Cruz (2003) 7x MLB All-Star, 2019 All-MLB First Team, 2020 All-MLB Second Team, 2011 ALCS MVP, 2x Silver Slugger, 2x Edgar Martínez Award, 2014 MLB Home Run Leader, 2017 AL RBI Leader, 2020 Marvin Miller Man of the Year Award, 2013 All-World Baseball Classic Team
 Andre Ethier (2003) 2x MLB All-Star, 2011 Gold Glove, 2009 Silver Slugger
 Dontrelle Willis (2002) 2x MLB All-Star, 2003 World Series Champion, 2003 NL Rookie of the Year, 2005 NL Wins Leader
 Miguel Cabrera (2001) 11x MLB All-Star, 2003 World Series Champion, 2× AL MVP, 2012 Triple Crown, 7x Silver Slugger, 2× AL Hank Aaron Award, 4× AL Batting Champion, 2× AL Home Run Leader, 2× AL RBI Leader
 Adrián González (2001) 5x MLB All-Star, 4x Gold Glove, 2x Silver Slugger, 2014 NL RBI Leader
 Josh Willingham (2001) 2012 Silver Slugger
 Josh Beckett (2000) 3x MLB All-Star, 2x (2003, 2007) World Series Champion, 2003 World Series MVP, 2007 ALCS MVP, 2007 MLB Wins Leader; 2014 No-Hitter
 Josh Wilson (2000)
 Nate Robertson (1999–2000)
 Claudio Vargas (1999)
 A. J. Burnett (1998) MLB All-Star, 2009 World Series Champion, 2008 AL Strikeout Leader, 2001 No-Hitter
 Scott Podsednik (1997) MLB All-Star, 2005 World Series Champion, 2004 NL Stolen Base Leader
 Ryan Dempster (1996) 2x MLB All-Star, 2013 World Series Champion
 Alex Gonzalez (1996)
 Mark Kotsay (1996) 
 Randy Winn (1996) MLB All-Star
 Luis Castillo (1995) 3x MLB All-Star, 2003 World Series Champion, 3x Gold Glove, 2x NL Stolen Base Leader
 Ryan Jackson (1995)
 Brian Meadows (1995)
 Antonio Alfonseca (1994) 1997 World Series Champion, 2000 NL Rolaids Relief Man Award, 2000 NL Saves Leader
 Félix Heredia (1994) 1997 World Series Champion
 Kevin Millar (1994) 2004 World Series Champion
 Héctor Carrasco (1993)
 Charles Johnson (1993) 2x MLB All-Star, 1997 World Series Champion, 4x Gold Glove
 Mike Redmond (1993–1994) 2003 World Series Champion
 Édgar Rentería (1993) 5x MLB All-Star, 2x World Series Champion, 2010 World Series MVP, 2x Gold Glove, 3x Silver Slugger
 Alex Ochoa (1992) 2002 World Series Champion
 Joe Borowski (1991) 2007 AL Saves Leader
 Tom Martin (1991)
 Brad Pennington (1991)
 Gregg Zaun (1991) 1997 World Series Champion

References

External links

 
 Statistics from Baseball-Reference

Baseball teams established in 1991
Defunct Midwest League teams
Sports in Kane County, Illinois
Professional baseball teams in Illinois
Geneva, Illinois
Arizona Diamondbacks minor league affiliates
Chicago Cubs minor league affiliates
Kansas City Royals minor league affiliates
Oakland Athletics minor league affiliates
Miami Marlins minor league affiliates
Baltimore Orioles minor league affiliates
Baseball teams in Chicago
1991 establishments in Illinois